Almshouse Branch is a  long 1st order tributary to Isaac Branch in Kent County, Delaware.

Course
Almshouse Branch rises about 3 miles southwest of Camden in Kent County, Delaware on the Cow Marsh Ditch divide.  Almshouse Branch then flows north to meet Isaac Branch about 2 miles west of Wyoming, Delaware.

Watershed
Almshouse Branch drains  of area, receives about 44.8 in/year of precipitation, has a topographic wetness index of 629.58 and is about 5% forested.

See also
List of Delaware rivers

Maps

References

Rivers of Delaware
Rivers of Kent County, Delaware